Rodney McSwain (born January 28, 1962) is a former professional American football cornerback in the National Football League. He played seven seasons for the New England Patriots (1984–1990). He also played two seasons in the Arena Football League with the Detroit Drive, winning ArenaBowl VI in 1992.

1962 births
Living people
People from Caroleen, North Carolina
Players of American football from North Carolina
American football cornerbacks
Clemson Tigers football players
New England Patriots players
Detroit Drive players